The 1961 World Table Tennis Championships men's doubles was the 26th edition of the men's doubles championship.
Koji Kimura and Nobuya Hoshino won the title after defeating Zoltán Berczik and Ferenc Sidó in the final by three sets to one.

Results

See also
List of World Table Tennis Championships medalists

References

-